Encino is a town and municipality in the Santander Department in northeastern Colombia.

Climate
Encino has a subtropical highland climate (Köppen Cfb) with cool to pleasant mornings, warm to very warm afternoons, and very heavy rainfall year round.

Born in Encino 
 Félix Cárdenas, professional cyclist

References

External links 

 Fly over Encino with Google's images 

Municipalities of Santander Department